Lara Maree Hooiveld (born 6 July 1971) is an Australian former swimmer. Hooiveld competed in three events at the 1988 Summer Olympics. Despite being of Australian nationality she won the ASA National British Championships over 100 metres breaststroke in 1990.

References

External links
 

1971 births
Living people
Australian female breaststroke swimmers
Olympic swimmers of Australia
Swimmers at the 1988 Summer Olympics
Michigan Wolverines women's swimmers
Place of birth missing (living people)
Commonwealth Games medallists in swimming
Commonwealth Games gold medallists for Australia
Swimmers at the 1990 Commonwealth Games
20th-century Australian women
21st-century Australian women
Medallists at the 1990 Commonwealth Games